This is a list of airports in Somalia, sorted by location. As of 2012, Somalia has 62 airports, 7 of these have paved runways. Among the latter, four have runways of over 3,047 m; two between 2,438 m and 3,047 m; and one 1,524 m to 2,437 m long.

There are 55 airports with unpaved landing areas. One has a runway of over 3,047 m; four are between 2,438 m to 3,047 m in length; twenty are 1,524 m to 2,437 m; twenty-four are 914 m to 1,523 m; and six are under 914 m.

Airports

Airport names shown in Bold have scheduled passenger service on commercial airlines.

See also

 List_of_airports_in_Somaliland
 Somali Air Force
 Transport in Somalia
 List of airports by ICAO code: H#HC - Somalia
 Wikipedia:WikiProject Aviation/Airline destination lists: Africa#Somalia

Notes

References

 
 
 
  - includes IATA codes
 Great Circle Mapper: Airports in Somalia - IATA and ICAO codes

Somalia
 
Airports
Airports
Somalia